Bushland is a term for naturally vegetated areas of Australia

Bushland may also refer to:

Bushland, Texas, a city in Texas.
Raymond Bushland, an entomologist

See also
 Bush
 The Bush